Georgy Muratovich Kabulov (born 23 November 1989) is a Russian footballer who plays as a defender for  Dynamo (Stavropol).

Career

Club career

Before the 2008 season, Kabulov signed for Russian fourth tier side Kazanka, helping them earn promotion to the Russian third tier. In 2014, he signed for Tavriya in Crimea. In 2022, he signed for Dynamo (Stavropol) in the Russian third tier.

International career

Kabul represented South Ossetia at the 2019 CONIFA European Football Cup, helping them win it.

References

External links

 

1989 births
Association football defenders
Crimean Premier League players
FC Mashuk-KMV Pyatigorsk players
FC Spartak Kostroma players
Living people
People from Tskhinvali
Russian footballers
Russian people of Georgian descent
Russian Second League players
SC Tavriya Simferopol players